Gauruncus rossi is a species of moth of the family Tortricidae. It is found in Bolivia and Pichincha Province, Ecuador.

The wingspan is 17.5 mm. The ground colour of the forewings is reddish brown, mixed with cream in the distal third of the wing between the veins, which are suffused with brown. There are three white spots in the posterior half of the costa and cream spots along the dorsum. The markings are brown. The hindwings are cream and almost entirely suffused with brownish grey.

Etymology
The species is named in honour of Mr. Dana Ross who supported the research of the authors with specimens collected at Reserva Las Gralarias.

References

Moths described in 2006
Euliini
Moths of South America
Taxa named by Józef Razowski